74 Virginis is a single star in the zodiac constellation of Virgo. It is visible to the naked eye as a faint red-hued star with an apparent visual magnitude of 4.69. The star is positioned near the ecliptic and thus is subject to lunar occultations. The measured annual parallax of  provides a distance estimate of around 400 light-years from the Sun. At that range, the visual magnitude of the star is diminished by an extinction of  due to interstellar dust. It is moving further from the Earth with a heliocentric radial velocity of +19 km/s.

This is an aging red giant star with a stellar classification of M2.5 III, which indicates it has exhausted the hydrogen at its core and evolved away from the main sequence. It is a suspected variable star that may vary in brightness with an amplitude of 0.07 in magnitude. The star is roughly 2.9 billion years old with 1.4 times the mass of the Sun and has expanded to around 78 times the Sun's radius. 74 Virginis is radiating 832 times the Sun's luminosity from its enlarged photosphere at an effective temperature of 3,500 K.

References 

M-type giants
Suspected variables
Virgo (constellation)
Virginis, l
Durchmusterung objects
Virginis, 074
117675
066006
5095